Parasyrphus punctulatus is a Palearctic species of hoverfly.

Distribution
It is found from Fennoscandia, south to the Pyrenees; from Ireland, east through Northern Europe and Central Europe, and south to Northern Italy; though European Russia and the Caucasus, on through Siberia and the Russian Far East to the Pacific coast and Japan, as well as the Himalayas and Nepal.

Biology
Habitat: Quercus, Fraxinus woodland and Betula, Salix, Alnus woodland suburban gardens and orchards with mature trees. Flowers visited include white umbellifers, Acer pseudoplatanus, Aliaria, Anemone nemorosa, Caltha, Cardamine, Crataegus, Euphorbia, Ilex, Ligustrum, Meum, Oxalis, Prunus cerasus, Prunus laurocerasus, Prunus spinosa, Ranunculus, Salix, Sambucus racemosa, Sorbus aucuparia, Taraxacum, Tussilago, Ulex, Viburnum opulus.  Flies mid April to mid June (later at higher altitudes).

Additional information
 External images
For terms see Morphology of Diptera See references for determination.

References

Diptera of Europe
Syrphinae
Insects described in 1873
Taxa named by George Henry Verrall